The 2020–21 Singapore circuit breaker measures were a stay-at-home order and cordon sanitaire implemented as a preventive measure by the Government of Singapore in response to the COVID-19 pandemic in the country on 7 April 2020.

The measures were brought into legal effect by the Minister for Health with the COVID-19 (Temporary Measures) (Control Order) Regulations 2020, published on 7 April 2020. Singapore was enjoying zero COVID cases until these were changed due to the Delta and Omicron COVID-19 variant from 8 May 2021 to 29 March 2022.

With its relative success in curbing the early spread of the virus in Singapore, the term "circuit breaker" and its measures was subsequently adopted by other countries, particularly in Canada and the United Kingdom.

Chronology 

Singapore recorded its first COVID-19 case on 23 January 2020. With that, many Singaporeans have purchased and worn masks when not at home; practiced social distancing and on 7 February 2020, Singapore raised the Disease Outbreak Response System Condition (DORSCON) level from Yellow to Orange in response to additional local cases of uncertain origin.

Prelude (27 March) 

On 24 March, the Multi-Ministry Task Force announced stricter measures to combat the spread of COVID-19, after a huge spike in cases originating from returning Singaporeans in the community. These measures include the closure of entertainment venues, tuition and enrichment centres and places of worship. Malls, retail establishments and tourist attractions were required to reduce their crowd density in order to stay open. Gatherings of more than 10 people outside of work and school are prohibited.

Initial measures (7 April) 

On 3 April, Prime Minister Lee Hsien Loong announced a nationwide partial lockdown, known as a circuit breaker, to contain the spread of COVID-19 in Singapore. These measures came after an increase of unlinked cases over the preceding month, as well as the risk of a huge cluster of infections. Most of the workplaces were converted to remote work as default during the lockdown and schools were transitioned to home-based learning thereafter. As dining-in is a high-risk activity; all food establishments were only allowed to offer take-away, drive-thru and delivery of food. Non-essential advertising at shopping centres are not allowed to be shown or advertised and only advertising from essential service offers and safe management measures such as mask wearing and social distancing are allowed. These measures would initially lapse on 4 May.

No one were allowed to leave their homes except for specified purposes, and even then, in groups of no larger than two. Visits to other households were also not allowed, except for caregiving purposes.

On 14 April, then-Minister for National Development Lawrence Wong announced that the wearing of masks became compulsory when not at home with immediate effect, with fines and prosecution for offenders who refuse to do so.

Tightened measures (21 April) 

After discovering that the unknown number of cases was greater than expected, Prime Minister Lee Hsien Loong announced on 21 April an extension of the circuit breaker to 1 June. Existing measures were also tightened until 4 May initially, including shrinking the list of essential services, such as closing all close-contact service providers such as hair salons, as well as restricting entry to certain hotspots like wet markets and some essential retail franchises going by the last digit of one's ID number. Popular markets utilized an odd/even date entry restriction; ID ending with odd numbers are only allowed entry on odd dates of the month and ID ending with even numbers are only allowed entry on even dates on the month. On 21 April, the Ministry of Education brought forward the 4-week school holidays for all MOE Kindergartens, primary, secondary and Pre-University students, which are usually held in June, to May. Institutes of Higher Learning extended their Home-based Learning. The Singapore franchise of McDonald's also shut all of its restaurants islandwide, as a response to a number of its employees being infected.

Relaxed measures (2 May) 

Some restrictions were relaxed progressively in stages to prepare for the end of the circuit breaker on 1 June. Traditional Chinese medicine (TCM) shops and essential condo activities were allowed to reopen on 5 May, followed by businesses like home-based bakeries (HBBs), some food shops, barbers (only basic haircuts), manufacturing of confectionery, and laundry shops on 12 May. Schools resumed face-to-face lessons for smaller groups in graduating cohorts and those requiring urgent assistance on 19 May.

At the same time, the Ministry of Health (MOH) mandated the use of SafeEntry contact-tracing system at all businesses and services from 12 May, but does not include "transient" locations like the MRT or parks, although people are encouraged to scan to assist in contact-tracing efforts.

On 8 May, the MOH announced that all TCM shops are allowed to sell retail products again from 12 May, after receiving feedback from seniors that travelling to the initially allowed 130 TCM medical halls was too far for them.

Post-circuit breaker (reopening) 

Earlier in 2020, there are three phases of planned reopening were announced, which is only relevant in the zero-COVID strategy. These were however ended on 8 May 2021 because of the Delta variant. Phase 1 (as in the loosened form of Heightened Alert) started on 2 June 2020, Phase 2 between 19 June 2020 and 17 July 2020, and Phase 3 officially started on 28 December 2020 until 8 May 2021. Restrictions due to Variant of Concern (Delta and Omicron) started on 8 May 2021 and ended on 29 March 2022, it was only able to have 2 and 5-person gatherings. Two lockdowns are from 16 May 2021 to 13 June 2021 and 23 July to 9 August 2021, but in between 14 June 2021 and 23 July 2021, the government only had a planned reopening for all similar to June 2020. The government then changed the reopening plan to only allow vaccinated persons to use the services from August 2021. Singapore has phased out its zero-COVID strategy on 9 October 2021. All remaining COVID-19 restrictions were lifted progressively on 29 March 2022 and 26 April 2022; but mask wearing is optional outdoors. Remaining mask regulations for indoor areas were removed on 29 August 2022, except in medical settings and public transportation, with the rest removed on public transportation and some medical settings on 13 February 2023.

In addition, it was announced on 14 December 2020 that the Pfizer-BioNTech vaccine was approved for use in Singapore, with the first batch slated for around end of December 2020. On 3 February 2021, the Moderna vaccine was approved for use in Singapore, with the first batch slated to arrive around March 2021. Subsequent batches for both vaccines are planned to arrive throughout 2021. A mass vaccination campaign was launched, and has been successful in achieving a very high vaccination rate.

See also 

 COVID-19 lockdowns
 COVID-19 lockdown in China
 COVID-19 lockdown in India
 COVID-19 lockdown in Italy
 COVID-19 community quarantines in the Philippines
 Enhanced community quarantine in Luzon
 Indonesia large-scale social restrictions
 Malaysian movement control order

References 

COVID-19 pandemic in Singapore
2020 in Singapore
Health in Singapore
Disease outbreaks in Singapore
Containment efforts related to the COVID-19 pandemic
City lockdowns
Country lockdowns
Covid
Dengue